Fuck The Demon Outta Me is the second album from the Welsh rock quartet The Guns. The album was released independently on 21 November 2011 through iTunes, with 200 hand numbered hard copies made available through the band's bigcartel store. Produced by Alex Wiltshire at The Lodge Productions studio, Fuck The Demon Outta Me has, so far, produced 2 singles, one of which has had a music video created for it.

Track listing
Daughter Of A Bad Man
All Aboard
Treacle And Pie
Answers
Voodoo Boogie
You Drive And I'll Eat This
Missing Girls
Moan Kill You To
Nighty Night Creepin'
Stranger Than You

Videos
Missing Girls (2011)

References

2011 albums
The Guns (band) albums